Hewett Creek is a stream in the U.S. state of West Virginia.

Hewett Creek was named after Richard Hewett, a local pioneer settler who was killed by Indians near the creek's banks.

See also
List of rivers of West Virginia

References

Rivers of Boone County, West Virginia
Rivers of Logan County, West Virginia
Rivers of West Virginia